Leptocereus is a genus of cacti native to the Greater Antilles. It has been placed in the tribe Leptocereeae or in a broadly defined Echinocereeae.

Species
, Plants of the World Online accepted the following species:

References

Cactoideae
Cacti of North America
Flora of the Caribbean
Cactoideae genera